Felipe Ignacio García Fuentes (born 26 October 1993) is a Chilean handball player who played on the Chilean national team. As of 2019, he plays for Club Italiano.

Career
In 2017, he played for Myk Hentbol in Turkey.
He participated at the 2017 World Men's Handball Championship, as part of Chile's national team.

In 2019, he played for Italiano BM.
He participated in the 2019 World Men's Handball Championship, as part of Chile's national team.

References

1993 births
Living people
Chilean male handball players
South American Games bronze medalists for Chile
South American Games medalists in handball
Competitors at the 2018 South American Games
Chilean expatriate sportspeople in Turkey
Expatriate handball players in Turkey
Pan American Games medalists in handball
Pan American Games silver medalists for Chile
Handball players at the 2019 Pan American Games
Medalists at the 2019 Pan American Games
20th-century Chilean people
21st-century Chilean people